Range is an unincorporated community located in the towns of Apple River and Beaver, Polk County, Wisconsin, United States. It is along U.S. Highway 8 and County Road D, 60th Street.

Notes

Unincorporated communities in Polk County, Wisconsin
Unincorporated communities in Wisconsin